Anna of Savoy, born Giovanna (1306–1365) was a Byzantine Empress consort, as the second spouse of Andronikos III Palaiologos. She served as regent, with the titles augusta and autokratorissa, during the minority of her son John V Palaiologos from 1341 until 1347. In Byzantium, she was known as Anna Palaiologina, owing to her marriage to Andronikos.

Life
Anna was a daughter of Amadeus V, Count of Savoy, and his second wife, Maria of Brabant. She was betrothed to Andronikos III Palaiologos in September 1325, during which time he was involved in a civil war with his paternal grandfather Andronikos II Palaiologos.

The marriage took place in October 1326. She joined the Eastern Orthodox Church and took the name Anna. In 1328, Andronikos III entered Constantinople and finally deposed his grandfather.

Regent
On 14-15 June 1341, Andronikos III died. He was succeeded by their son John V who was still three days short of his ninth birthday. Anna was appointed regent for her son. However Andronikos III had entrusted the administration to his advisor John Kantakouzenos. Anna did not trust the powerful advisor.

At about the same time, Stefan Uroš IV Dušan of Serbia launched an invasion of Northern Thrace. Kantakouzenos left Constantinople to try to restore order to the area. In his absence, Patriarch John XIV of Constantinople and courtier Alexios Apokaukos convinced Anna that the senior advisor was her enemy. Anna declared Kantakouzenos an enemy of the state and offered the title of eparch of Constantinople to Apokaukos.

Kantakouzenos was still in control of part of the Byzantine army. On 26 October 1341, he answered by proclaiming himself emperor at Didymoteicho. This was the beginning of a civil war that would last until 1347. Ivan Alexander of Bulgaria soon allied with the faction under John V and Anna while Stefan Uroš IV Dušan of Serbia sided with John VI. Both rulers were actually taking advantage of the civil war for their own political and territorial gains. In time John VI would ally himself with Orhan I of the nascent Ottoman emirate.

At the same time Anna was attempting to gain support from Western Europe. In Summer, 1343 an emissary proclaimed her loyalty to Pope Clement VI in Avignon. In August, 1343, Anna pawned the Byzantine crown jewels to the Republic of Venice for 30,000 ducats as part of an attempt to secure more finances for the war. However Anna at last lost the war.

On 3 February 1347, the two sides reached an agreement. John VI was accepted as senior emperor with John V as his junior co-ruler. The agreement included the marriage of John V to Helena Kantakouzene, a daughter of John VI. John VI entered Constantinople and took effective control of the city.

Later years

In 1351, Anna left Constantinople for Thessaloniki. She held her own court in the city, issuing decrees in her name and even controlling a mint. She was the second Byzantine empress to hold court in Thessaloniki, following Irene of Montferrat. Her rule there lasted to about 1365.

Her last official act was the donation of a convent in the memory of Agioi Anargyroi (Greek: «Άγιοι Ανάργυροι» "The Holy Unmercenaries"). Agioi Anargyroi is the joined description of Saints Cosmas and Damian, who supposedly 
offered free medical services. Their devotees usually pray for healing. The donation may indicate Anna suffering from poor health and hoping for a cure. A little later she became a nun and died under the name "Anastasia" ca. 1365.

Issue
 Maria (renamed Eirene) Palaiologina (1327 – after 1356), who married Michael Asen IV of Bulgaria. 
 John V Palaiologos (18 June 1332 – 16 February 1391).
 Michael Palaiologos, despotes (1337 – before 1370). He entered the court of Stefan Uroš IV Dušan of Serbia in 1351/1352.
 Eirene (renamed Maria) Palaiologina (d. 6 August 1384), who married Francesco I of Lesbos.

References

Sources
 

1306 births
1365 deaths
Byzantine regents
House of Savoy
Palaiologos dynasty
People from Thessaloniki
14th-century Byzantine empresses
14th-century viceregal rulers
14th-century women rulers
Converts to Eastern Orthodoxy from Roman Catholicism
Empresses dowager
14th-century people from Savoy
Mothers of Byzantine emperors